The 2017 Caribbean Handball Cup was a Handball Event held at the city of Cartagena Colombia, from 24 to 29 October to qualify the nations of the Caribe region for the handball tournament of the 2018 Central American and Caribbean Games.

Participating teams

Men

Women

Medal summary

Men's tournament

Qualification round

All times are local (UTC−05:00).

Final Round

5th place match

Bronze medal match

Gold medal match

Final standing

All-star team
Goalkeeper:  Alejandro Romero
Right Wing:  Jorge Montanillo
Right Back:  Julio Baez
Playmaker:  Abel Villalobos
Left Back:  Alan Villalobos
Left Wing:  José Sanchez
Pivot:  Sergio Sanchez

Women's tournament

Qualification round

All times are local (UTC−05:00).

Final Round

5th place match

Bronze medal match

Gold medal match

Final standing

All-star team
Goalkeeper:  Niurkis Mora
Right Wing:  Nahomy Rodriguez
Right Back:  Guadalupe Saavedra
Playmaker:  Celene Cifuentes
Left Back:  Carolina López
Left Wing:  Zuleika Fuentes
Pivot:  Ciris García

References

External links
Page of the championship on Balonmano Colombia website

Caribbean Handball Cup
2017 in Colombian sport
Caribbean Handball Cup
International handball competitions hosted by Colombia
Caribbean Handball Championship